Oldfield Land District is a land district (cadastral division) of Western Australia partly within the Eucla and South-West divisions on the state's south coast. It spans roughly 33°15'S - 34°00'S in latitude and 119°45'E - 121°10'E in longitude.

Location and features
Most of the district is within the Shire of Ravensthorpe, although part is within the Shire of Esperance. It includes the following townsites, with year of gazettal noted:

 Cascade (1976)
 Desmond (1909)
 Hopetoun (1901)
 Jerdacuttup (1966)
 Kundip (1902)
 Munglinup (1962)
 Ravensthorpe (1901)

History
On 20 August 1896, Harry Johnston, the Deputy Surveyor General of Western Australia, recommended that four new districts be created in the Esperance region. The Minister approved the names on 11 September, and on 23 September 1896 the district was added to the Standard Plans in use by the Department of Lands and Surveys. As it was approved prior to the Land Act 1898, its boundaries were never gazetted.

References

Land districts of Western Australia
Goldfields-Esperance